Robert Eugene Kitterman (April 2, 1923 – November 14, 2000) was an American professional basketball player. He played for the Syracuse Nationals in the National Basketball League during the 1947–48 season and averaged 5.0 points per game.

References

1923 births
2000 deaths
American men's basketball players
American military personnel of World War II
Basketball players from Iowa
Guards (basketball)
Forwards (basketball)
People from Burlington, Iowa
People from Ottumwa, Iowa
Southeastern Blackhawks men's basketball players
Syracuse Nationals players